No Matter What may refer to:

 "No Matter What" (Badfinger song), 1970
 "No Matter What" (Boyzone song), 1998
 "No Matter What" (Calum Scott song), 2018
 "No Matter What" (George Lamond and Brenda K. Starr song), 1990
 "No Matter What" (T.I. song), 2008
 "No Matter What" (Ryan Stevenson song), 2018
 "No Matter What", a song by Aretha Franklin (feat. Mary J. Blige) from So Damn Happy
 "No Matter What", a song by Jeremy Camp from Beyond Measure
 "No Matter What", a song by Heavy D from Vibes
 "No Matter What", a song by Kerrie Roberts
 "No Matter What", a song by Papa Roach from  Time for Annihilation: On the Record & On the Road
 "No Matter What", a song from the musical Beauty and the Beast
 No Matter What (TV series), a 2020 South Korean television series

See also
 "No Matta What" (Party All Night), a 2001 song by Toya
 Noh Matta Wat!, Brazilian TV series
 "No Matter Who", a 1997 song by Phil Collins